Surp Hagop Church (Armenian: Սուրբ Յակոբ Եկեղեցի); also Saint Jacob or Saint James, is a small Armenian Apostolic church, located on al-Iman street in the Old Syriac (Assyrian) quarter of Aleppo, Syria. It was opened in 1943 and later enlarged in 1962.

Overview
The ground blessing ceremony of this small church took place on 3 June 1934, during the period of Archbishop Ardavazt Surmeyan of the Armenian Diocese of Beroea, on a piece of land occupying around 750 square meters, donated by the Italian General Consul of Aleppo, Georgio Marcopolli. However, the construction process started only in 1940, with the erection of a small building. The consecration of the church took place in 1943 with the presence of the community leaders. The church was named in the honour of Saint Jacob of Nisibis.

The current shape of the church dates back to 1962, after a major enlargement process. Surrounded with a small yard, the church is still without dome and belfry.

In 1988–89, the church has been completely renovated by the Armenian Diocese of Beroea.

Gallery

References

External links
 Official site of the Armenian Catholicosate of Cilicia
 Armenian Prelacy of Beroea (Aleppo, Syria)

Armenian Apostolic churches in Syria
James' Church, Saint
Churches completed in 1943